This is a list of flag bearers who have represented Togo at the Olympics.

Flag bearers carry the national flag of their country at the opening ceremony of the Olympic Games.

See also
Togo at the Olympics

References

Togo at the Olympics
Togo
Olympic flagbearers